Haberlandia hintzi is a moth in the family Cossidae. It is found in Cameroon. The habitat consists of evergreen coastal rainforests.

The wingspan is about 24 mm. The forewings are deep colonial buff with Isabella colour lines from the costal margin towards the dorsum. The hindwings are deep colonial buff with faded lines of Isabella colour.

References

Natural History Museum Lepidoptera generic names catalog

Endemic fauna of Cameroon
Moths described in 1911
Metarbelinae
Taxa named by Ingo Lehmann